William Edward Travers (born October 27, 1952) is an American former professional baseball pitcher.

Early years
Travers attended Norwood High School, where he pitched three no-hitters, and was 13-0 with one save as a senior. He also played for the Norwood Post 70 American Legion team. The southpaw was drafted by the Milwaukee Brewers in the sixth round of the 1970 Major League Baseball draft five months shy of his 18th birthday.

Used primarily as a long reliever in manager Del Crandall's bullpen, Travers went 2-3 with a 4.92 earned run average.

He started the following season with the triple A Sacramento Solons, however, in desperate need of starting pitching, the Brewers called Travers up in June (Travers was one of 13 different starting pitchers Crandall used in ). Travers went 6-11 with a 4.48 ERA as a starter. He also made five relief appearances, and collected the only save of his career on June 21 against the Cleveland Indians.

All-Star
The highlight of his first half was a pitchers' duel against the New York Yankees' Dock Ellis at Yankee Stadium. Ellis held the Brewers to one run on four hits. Travers, meanwhile, pitched a four-hit shutout, in which he also collected a season high eight strikeouts. He also pitched shutouts against the Chicago White Sox & California Angels on his way to the only All-Star nod of his career. He sputtered in the second half, however, going 5-10 with a 3.92 ERA. For the season, he led his team with 15 victories and a 2.81 ERA. His 240 innings pitched were a career high.

Injuries
Travers was named the  Opening Day starter, and started the season 3-4 with a 3.23 ERA, until injuries once again derailed his career. After nearly two months on the disabled list, Travers returned in late July, but was highly ineffective. He went 1-8 with a 6.82 ERA over the remainder of the season. The low point of his season came on August 14 in the second game of a doubleheader with the Indians. Regardless of his ineffectiveness and history of arm trouble, Brewers manager Alex Grammas left Travers in the game for 155 pitches. He finally left the game in the eighth inning, having surrendered 14 earned runs.

Travers underwent a second ulnar transfer operation during the off-season, this time under Dr. Frank Jobe, the doctor who became famous for performing Tommy John's successful surgery. He returned to the Brewers under new manager George Bamberger in May , and went 12-11 with a 4.41 ERA in 28 starts.

California Angels
Travers signed a four-year free agent contract with the California Angels on January 26, . He faced just one batter in his fourth start with his new club, walking Yankees second baseman Willie Randolph on four pitches before he needed to be pulled from the game. Calcium deposits were found in his pitching elbow. He sat out the remainder of the season in an unsuccessful attempted to let the injury heal. He had surgery during the off season to have the calcium deposits removed, causing him to miss the entire  season in which the Angels captured the American League West.

Travers returned to the mound for the Angels on May 10, . He made ten appearances, going 0-3 with a 5.91 ERA before he was released.

Career stats

His only career plate appearance came against the New York Yankees on July 29, 1979. He successfully sacrificed Jim Wohlford over to second.

Personal life
Travers married his high school sweetheart, Linda, and had a daughter named Tiffany. His father was a semi-pro catcher, who later served as a police officer in Norwood for 38 years.

Travers is also a very good candlepin bowler, He's made appearances on Channel 5's Candlepin Bowling show in Boston, and was on the  USA team that won the World Championships.

References

External links

1952 births
Living people
American expatriate baseball players in Canada
Baseball players from Massachusetts
California Angels players
Clinton Pilots players
Danville Warriors players
Edmonton Trappers players
Evansville Triplets players
Major League Baseball pitchers
Milwaukee Brewers players
People from Norwood, Massachusetts
Redwood Pioneers players
Sacramento Solons players
San Antonio Brewers players
St. Lucie Legends players